The Bobbili Urban Development Authority (BUDA) is an urban planning agency in Vizianagaram district of the Indian state of Andhra Pradesh. It was constituted on 12 February 2019, under Andhra Pradesh Metropolitan Region and Urban Development Authorities Act, 2016 with the headquarters located at Bobbili.

Jurisdiction 
It covers 572 villages in 11 mandals of Vizianagaram. The below table lists the urban areas of BUDA.

References 

Vizianagaram district
Urban development authorities of Andhra Pradesh
State urban development authorities of India
2019 establishments in India